Kay Stisi (born 12 June 1971) is a German former professional footballer who played as a forward. He played Bundesliga with St. Pauli. In 1995 he trialled with Stabæk together with teammate Andreas Mayer, but only Mayer secured a transfer.

References

1971 births
Living people
German footballers
Association football forwards
Bundesliga players
2. Bundesliga players
FC St. Pauli players
VfB Lübeck players
BV Cloppenburg players
VfB Oldenburg players
SV Wilhelmshaven players
SV Wilhelmshaven managers